Grav may refer to:

People
 Ray Gravell (1951-2007), Welsh rugby union player
  (born 1973), Norwegian astrophysicist

Places
 Grav, Bærum, Norway
 Grav, Viken, Norway

Physics
 General Relativity and Gravitation
 Gravitational constant

Other
 Gravlax, Nordic dish
 Grav (CMS)
 Grav Armor
 Grav-Ball